Gomugomuwa is a village located in Paduwasnuwara Provincial Council, Kurunegala District, Sri Lanka and is 5 km away from Kuliyapitiya Town. The Gomugomuwa area is divided into two parts, Ihala Gomugomuwa and Pahala Gomugomuwa. Coconut and rice cultivation are the main economic activities in this area.

References

Populated places in North Western Province, Sri Lanka